The Chambri Lakes are a series of swamps and shallow water canals in the East Sepik Province of Papua New Guinea that are seasonally filled by the flooding of the Sepik and Ramu rivers in vast area of  .  During the northwest monsoon season, from September to March, occurs overflow of two of the Sepik's tributaries and vast Chambri Lake is created.  The Chambri Lakes form in the middle Sepik, between the village of Pagwi and the junction of the Yuat River with the Sepik. The inhabitants of the Chambri Lakes are renowned for their artistry. The Chambri language is spoken in the Chambri Lakes region.

References 

Lakes of Papua New Guinea